The Forgan Smith Ministry was a ministry of the Government of Queensland and was led by Labor Premier William Forgan Smith. It succeeded the Moore Ministry on 18 June 1932, seven days after Arthur Edward Moore's CPNP government was defeated at the 1932 state election. The ministry was followed by the Cooper Ministry on 16 September 1942 following Forgan Smith's retirement from politics.

First ministry

On 18 June 1932, the Governor, Sir Leslie Orme Wilson, designated 10 principal executive offices of the Government, and appointed the following Members of the Legislative Assembly of Queensland to the Ministry as follows:

Second ministry

Labor was re-elected at the 1935 election and the Ministry was reconstituted on 21 May 1935.

Third ministry

Labor was re-elected at the 1938 election and the Ministry was reconstituted on 12 April 1938.

Fourth ministry

Labor was re-elected at the 1941 election and the Ministry was reconstituted on 16 April 1941. The Ministers served until the resignation of William Forgan Smith on 16 September 1942 and the formation of a new ministry under Deputy Premier Frank Cooper.

 John O'Keefe died on 27 January 1942. On 9 February, Arthur Jones was appointed to the Ministry.

References
 
 
 
 
 
 
 
 
 
 

Queensland ministries
Australian Labor Party ministries in Queensland